Jatin Sapru is an Indian sport's television host, broadcaster and cricket commentator who works for Star Sports network. 

He also has a YouTube channel, 'Jatin Sapru', where he uploads vlogs etc.

Early life
Sapru was born in a Kashmiri Pandit family. His grandfather was a Vice Principal in Kashmir University and father was an engineer. In 1990, his family along with other Hindu families in the region had to flee from Kashmir valley to Delhi as a result of being targeted by JKLF and Islamist insurgents during late 1989 and early 1990, the event which is infamously known as the Exodus of Kashmiri Hindus.

References

Indian cricket commentators
Living people
1986 births
People from Delhi
Kashmiri Pandits
Indian people of Kashmiri descent